The mossy forest shrew (Crocidura musseri) is a species of shrew native to Indonesia.

References

musseri
Mammals described in 1995